Ink Pen is an American daily comic strip by Phil Dunlap which was syndicated by Universal Press Syndicate/Universal Uclick from 2005 to 2012. 

It's about an employment agency for out-of-work cartoon characters. Some of the comics characters include: Bixby, the former child star and now a dirty rat; Fritz, a dog and boss of the agency; Hamhock, a pig who is trying to get his 15 minutes of fame; Captain Victorious, a lazy super hero with a  would-be sidekick, Scrappy Lad, that he doesn't want; Ralston, a rabbit who is just looking for a higher group of people, and Tyr, the Norse god of single combat, trying to pull his decent weight around anger management and Valhallan Attitude. There is also Dynaman, the rival of Captain Victorious; Mr. Negato, the enemy of Captain Victorious, and Scrappy Lad, the useless weak sidekick who is more interested in a girl named Moxie Gumption (a more streetwise version of Little Orphan Annie). Jenn Erica is a female filler character who tries repeatedly to get a lead character. Hela is the Norse goddess of the Underworld, with a surprisingly cheerful disposition. She claims to be related to Tyr, but their kinship is rather tenuous. Ms. Amazement gives the impression of being a parody of Wonder Woman, but her background is Celtic rather than Greek.

As of October 2012, the daily strip went in reruns, with plans to have new weekly comics running concurrently after a brief hiatus.

External links
 About Phil Dunlap and his comic at 'The Cartoonists'
 Ink Pen: A Cartoon Collection by Phil Dunlap, Andrews McMeel Publishing, 2009

References

American comic strips
2005 comics debuts
2012 comics endings
Gag-a-day comics
Satirical comics
Comics about animals
Comics about mice and rats
Comics about pigs
Comics about rabbits and hares
Fictional unemployed people
Norse mythology in comics